Forgive Them For They Know Not What They Do is Fokofpolisiekar's first compilation album. It was released in 2009.

The title is a quote from the Bible said by Jesus in Luke 23:34.

Track listing

References 

Fokofpolisiekar albums
2009 compilation albums